Mikkalo is an unincorporated community in Gilliam County, Oregon, United States, at an elevation of . Mikkalo has a post office, serving ZIP code of 97861, and is in the 541 area code region. In 1905, the place was named for settler John Mikkalo, and a post office opened at Mikkalo in 1907. It was along the Condon Branch of the Union Pacific Railroad. The Mikkalo Farmers Elevator had a fire on March 28, 1921.

This region experiences warm (but not hot) and dry summers, with no average monthly temperatures above .  According to the Köppen Climate Classification system, Mikkalo has a warm-summer Mediterranean climate, abbreviated "Csb" on climate maps.

References

Unincorporated communities in Gilliam County, Oregon
Unincorporated communities in Oregon